Amazing Agent Luna is an original English-language manga series written by Nunzio DeFilippis and Christina Weir (also authors of Destiny's Hand), with art by Shiei. It is published by Seven Seas Entertainment. The first volume of Amazing Agent Luna was one of Seven Seas Entertainment's four initial releases. In July 2005, Amazing Agent Luna became the first of Seven Seas Entertainment's titles to have its second volume released. It is Seven Seas Entertainment's best-selling OEL manga..

There are 11 volumes out, with volume 11 released on October 27, 2015.  Seven Seas Entertainment has also released four omnibus volumes. The first contains volumes 1–3, the second contains volumes 4–5, and the third contains volumes 6–7, with a fourth containing volumes 8–9. The fifth, containing the final two volumes, was released on December 15, 2015. It has also created a spin-off series, Amazing Agent Jennifer, which focuses on Jennifer Kajiwara, Luna's biological mother. This series contains two volumes.

Plot
The story follows Luna, a genetically bred super-spy created by the US government. At age 15, Luna is given her toughest assignment yet: after being raised in isolation and only trained as a spy, she must now pose as a normal high school girl. Since she never knew real parents or friends, things quickly become very confusing for her. She makes friends with Oliver, a skater with a crush on her; and Francesca, a nice girl who used to be friends with Luna's rival. But she also has to deal with the emotions and events many teenagers face. To make matters much harder on Luna, the boy she develops a crush on, Jonah, is the son of her main enemy, Count Von Brucken.

Characters

Luna The main protagonist does not know a lot about the real world and often gets confused about things she does not understand. Even though she's been raised in solitude for most of her life, she's a fast learner and quickly picks up on things. She is an amazing spy and fighter, but rather than being a mission-focused agent, Luna is gentle and quite sensitive and yearns for the comfort of family and friends. Her name as a student is Luna Collins. When enrolled into Nobel High, her honest and kind personality quickly earned her a friendship with Francesca and Oliver and becomes closer to Jonah, but she soon begins to juggle between her secret duties as an agent and being honest with her friends. Luna has feelings for Jonah but likes Oliver as just-a-friend. In the 4th book, she kissed Jonah with him promising that he'd keep her secrets.
Count Heinrich Von Brucken The main antagonist in the whole series. He's more of a comic villain. Luna breaks into his embassy in Paris where she discovers files on students in Noble High for "Project Scion". What project Scion truly is remains a mystery until the very end. It is a plan to take the sons and daughters (scions) of the important people sending them there, clone and genetically enhance them, replace the clones' minds with the minds of Bruckenstien loyalists who have been studying them for years, then place them back in Noble High as "students".
Francesca Aldana Francesca is the daughter of Spanish diplomats. She is described to have red hair. She once hung out with Elizabeth Westbrook and her gang until Luna appeared to the school. From the first day Francesca met Luna, she became fast friends with her and Oliver Riggs. Elizabeth gave Francesca the choice of either hanging with her or hang with Luna and Oliver. Francesca eventually chooses Luna and Oliver, and Elizabeth has picked on her ever since. Francesca, in the 4th book, is shown to have some feelings toward Oliver but because Oliver's crush on Luna blinds him so, she disregards it and falls in love with Timothy, a boy at the school. She often expresses how gross she thinks the genetic engineering and clones are, so Luna telling her about her secrets will be hard.
Soon, Luna is forced to recruit Timothy into her work, first to save Jia Lin, and then more often afterwards. As Timothy spends more time secretly helping Jia and Luna, in addition to both keeping secrets from her, Francesca doesn't take the exclusion from Timothy and her friends quite well, and her friendship with Luna becomes strained. Unlike Luna's and Oliver's more serious family problems and their issues with Luna's spy work, because Francesca is mostly left out of Luna's secret life, most of the difficulties she endures are of her social life at school. She briefly returns to Elizabeth's side, but eventually reconciles with Luna.
Oliver Riggs The son of Charles Riggs, a security guard at the U.N. His mother, Bowie O'Shea, was a musician who left after Oliver was born. Oliver was the outcast at Nobel High, being a 'loser skater'. When Luna came to their school, Oliver develops a crush on her. He knows that Luna likes Jonah very much, but he does not accept it. He does not notice that Francesca has or had a crush on him. He later finds out Luna's identity when they are being attacked by a clone of Elizabeth Westbrook.
Later, it is discovered that Oliver's father is working with Count Von Brucken, and he gets arrested. Oliver then lives with his mother, who is pretty easygoing despite their distant relationship, but does try to take care of him. But when Oliver discovers that Luna's agency is forcing Brucken to work for them, he gets angry at Luna for letting Brucken live in their house, while Oliver's father is still in jail. His relationship with Luna becomes strained, but he nonetheless keeps her secret.
Oliver soon becomes good friends with Heather, one of Elizabeth's lackeys. Heather warms up to Oliver's kindness, and becomes sick of Elizabeth's bossiness. Oliver hangs with Heather while he is still upset with Luna, but still doesn't confirm that Heather is actually his girlfriend. He eventually reconciles with Luna, and he, Luna, and Francesca reaffirm their friendship with each other.
Jonah Von Brucken The son of Luna's main enemy, Count Von Brucken. He goes to the same school as Luna. He is mysterious, brooding, and handsome. He later ends up falling in love with Luna. He was expelled in the third book for beating up a boy named Erich Kohler. In the 4th book, he was able to return to Nobel High. Also in the 4th book, he tells Luna he knows everything about her, ever since their first meeting in Paris. During the end of their mission with Charles trying to break into the UN files the first time, he promises Luna that he'd protect her secret and kisses her. He later nearly betrays her when he learns that her Control Agent was the one who killed his mother, but saves Luna, Francesca, and Oliver in the end.
Jennifer "Control" Kajiwara Luna's by-the-book control agent, Control poses as Luna's mother, but hates working with Dr. Andy. Contrary to Dr. Andy's priorities, Control is usually more concerned with the integrity of the mission rather than Luna's welfare. Ironically, Control, who has raised Luna ever since she was "born" in a secret lab, is the closest thing Luna has to a mother. In the 4th book, it is shown that she's developed feelings for Andrew "Andy" Collins. She is later revealed to be Luna's real mother and the reason she is so set on Luna not failing is so that government will not terminate her. At the end of the third book, Control takes over the position of science teacher at Nobel High. In the seventh book, it is revealed that Control and Dr. Andy both have feelings for each other, and they both share a kiss which Luna walks in on.
Andrew "Andy" Collins Usually called "Dr. Andy." He poses as Luna's father, and at first dislikes working with Control. Unlike Control, he is very concerned about Luna's emotional health, and often gives Luna social advice that Control is unable to provide. In the 4th book, he quits over Control's pushing him to make Luna Okay with killing, but he decides to stay for Luna's sake and due to Control threatening his safety once he leaves. His feelings for Control have been confirmed in the 6th book.
Timothy Hyatt A very smart boy attending Noble High. After Dr. Warren is busted for her cloning experiments, he was dragged along by his friend Martin who started using the lab to clone dates for the upcoming spring dance, the first of which rampaged and died shortly after being made from poor cloning. He offers to help Francesca with science and develops a crush on her. Despite Martin's insisting he will not clone her for the dance. Later the boys are hired by Von Brucken, but Timothy turns on them and frees Elizabeth.
He is dating Francesca. Luna is often forced to ask for his help in her secret work, first to help Jia Lin, and then in future missions when his intelligence becomes vital. Because his and Luna's secret work divides his time with Francesca, and because they have to keep it a secret from her, Francesca becomes upset with them for their dishonesty.
Elizabeth Westbrook The daughter of a British Scientist and Diplomat. She is the most popular girl at Nobel High, and a stereotypical spoiled princess and stuck-up brat. She was once friends with Francesca until Luna came to Nobel High and Francesca became friends with Luna and Oliver. Elizabeth gave Francesca a choice between her or Luna. Francesca decided to be with Luna and Oliver, so Elizabeth started to pick on her. She went out with Jonah Von Brucken as a way to tick off Luna, but she broke the relationship after the first semester. She is later kidnapped by Count Von Brucken under his belief that she is the secret agent he's been looking for. They make a genetically enhanced clone of her and were going to kill her, but Timothy turned sides and rescued her. Elizabeth is usually seen with at least two lackeys who follow her, whom she expects to be completely loyal and obedient to her and dump other friends like Luna. She is very vain and bossy, and her insufferable personality gradually costs her some of her friends. Francesca leaves her early in the series to become friends with Luna and Oliver, Jia Lin also becomes friends with Luna and Timothy, and Heather becomes friends with Oliver and becomes fed up Elizabeth's attitude.
Principle Ohlinger The good-hearted principal of Luna's high school. She was kidnapped and had her intelligence switched with that of an owl until Luna and Ohlinger's pet owl, Aristotle, saved her and was able to switch Ohlinger's mind back into her body.
Mark Dreyfus The ex-Navy Seal gym teacher at Noble High. He is one of the first to learn of Luna's secret. Some of the students find him big and scary, but after learning Luna's secret, he becomes very helpful to her whenever needed. He later starts a romantic relationship with Oliver's mother and proposes to her, and she accepts, which Oliver is not so happy about. 
Bowie O'Shea Oliver's mom who returns to take care of him after his father gets arrested. She did have a crush on Dr. Collins, but whatever happened between them is over according to volume six. She's a musician who was on tour when she arrived. She later becomes good friends with Mark Dreyfus, the gym teacher of the school. He eventually proposes to her, which she accepts.
Jia Lin  A beautiful and reserved Chinese exchange student. She was initially friends with Elizabeth and her group, but Elizabeth tried to recruit her into her group because she mistook Jia's silent demeanor as being stuck up just like Elizabeth. When she gets damaged during a fight between Luna, Jonah and Anders, she discovers that she is actually a robot, built by her supposed father. Distraught to learn that she isn't human, she begins to question and deny the value of her own life, despite some of her friends still being there for her even after learning what she is. Luna recruits Timothy to repair her, and then recruits him again when Jia gets kidnapped, and her heart is turned into a fusion bomb. Luna and Timothy manage to save her, and she moves away afterwards, grateful to her friends. Jia is soon forced out of hiding, due to the fusion technology within her being highly desired by various corrupt parties, including Luna's and Jennifer's superiors, and it falls to Luna, Jonah, and Anders to protect her.
Anders Haugen A student at Nobel High, who becomes Luna's love interest after she and Jonah become more distant. Anders is actually an agent of Knightfall, and secret organization that works to sabotage secret government operations. Though on opposite sides with Luna, he believes that he is right to fight Luna's agency, which is seemingly becoming more corrupt and immoral. He pursues Luna's affections, and Luna eventually reciprocates, albeit reluctantly. Luna eventually breaks up with him, being unable to commit to his organization. Despite that, he still insists that he is her ally, which may turn out true when Luna's agency pursues Jia Lin and turns against Luna and her family and friends.

References

External links
Amazing Agent Luna at Seven Seas Entertainment's website

Action-adventure comics
Romance anime and manga
Seven Seas Entertainment titles
2005 comics debuts
2005 manga
Original English-language manga